Marrow (Sarah) is a superheroine appearing in media published by Marvel Comics, commonly in association with the X-Men. She is depicted as a mutant whose bones grow out of her skin. These can be removed from her body, providing her with potential knives, clubs, and body armor.

As a child, Marrow was taken in by the Morlocks, a band of grotesque-looking mutants who hid in tunnels beneath New York City. As a young adult, she formed the violent splinter cell Gene Nation until, under the orders of Morlock leader Callisto, she joined the X-Men to redeem herself. She made progress controlling her powers and learning a moral code, but eventually fell in with the paramilitary group Weapon X.

Marrow first appeared in Cable #15 (Sept. 1994) and was created by writer Jeph Loeb and artist David Brewer. However, The Uncanny X-Men writer Scott Lobdell and artist Joe Madureira defined her powers and temperament. She later appeared as Marrow in X-Men Prime (1995).

Publication history

Sarah first appeared in Cable #15 (Sept. 1994) as a child, and was created by writer Jeph Loeb and artist David Brewer. She later appeared as Marrow in X-Men Prime (1995).

Fictional character biography

Origin
As a child, Sarah was one of the underground-dwelling Morlocks. During the Mutant Massacre that devastated the Morlock community, she witnessed the mauling of Angel by the Marauders. She was saved by Gambit, who was then not yet known by the X-Men. Years later, most of the surviving Morlocks (including Sarah) were apparently killed by Mikhail Rasputin, although they were actually brought to another dimension. There, Mikhail had established a citadel for himself on the top of a massive hill. The Social Darwinist philosophy of "survival of the fittest" was the only thing which governed the society. If someone could reach the summit of the hill, they were considered "fit" and worthy of being part of Gene Nation. [Storm #1-4 1996]

The former Morlock leader Callisto cared for Marrow during this period and displayed a maternal attitude towards the young mutant, although the two are not known to be biologically related. When her powers fully manifested, she was forced to "up the hill", becoming more savage and killing her opponents to survive. When she managed to reach the top, Mikhail considered her fit to join his elite fighting team Gene Nation, which eventually became a terrorist group whose mission was to punish humans for their hatred towards mutants.

Gene Nation

In that harsh dimension, time passed quickly, and when Marrow and several other members of Gene Nation (of which she had become leader) returned to Earth, they discovered only a few years had passed during their absence. Marrow and the other members of Gene Nation began a homicidal terrorist campaign against surface-dwelling humans. After inconclusive battles with the X-Men and Generation X, Gene Nation was defeated by the X-Men. Marrow wired a time bomb to her own heart to force the X-Man Storm, who had herself led the Morlocks in the past, to either yield or kill her; Storm tore out Marrow's heart. However, due to Marrow's possession of two hearts to compensate for her random bone growth and superhuman regenerative abilities, she survived. Marrow eventually reunited with Callisto, and while they continued their terrorist activities, Callisto tried to hold back Marrow's more violent ways.

X-Men

After a battle with Cable, Marrow and Callisto returned to seclusion. When Callisto was injured by a Prime Sentinel during the events of Operation: Zero Tolerance, she directed Marrow to seek the aid of the X-Men. After teaming up with Iceman and Cecilia Reyes, Marrow went to the Xavier Institute. She joined the X-Men for a time, coming under the mentorship of Wolverine and flirting with her teammate Cannonball. When the team came under the attack of the Shadow King, Marrow managed to resist when the Shadow King tempted and tortured her in an attempt to gain her loyalty. She also helped Cannonball resist by viciously destroying the illusion of his abusive father. Cannonball was shaken by seeing Marrow slay the illusion of his parent.

Marrow also participated in the fight against the returning N'Garai, extra-dimensional monsters who were loose on the grounds of the X-Mansion. She saved fellow X-Men Cecilia Reyes by impaling one of the creatures threatening her.

Around this time Marrow would confront Spider-Man, because both were interested in investigating a unique type of kidnapping. Eyewitnesses reported the victims literally dragged into the sewers, something which of course interested Marrow, because of her Morlock heritage. Investigating the disappearances, they discovered them to be the work of the vampire-like being known as Hunger, who was swiftly defeated in a confrontation with Spider-Man.

During an adventure in another dimension, Gambit, unable to control his powers, accidentally injured Marrow. She later traveled to the past with the X-Men, ending up on the Skrull homeworld a short time before the cosmic entity known as Galactus would destroy it. A medical device gave her more control over her powers, giving her a "prettier" appearance. The suspension-properties of a captured Skrull rescue ship allowed her and her fellow X-Men to make the journey back to earth in real time, without aging at all. Thus, for a while, two Marrows existed in the time stream, one on earth and one in space.

The change of her features led to major softening of her personality, to the point where she reached out to Jubilee following Wolverine's disappearance in the lead up to "The Twelve" storyline. She also tried to cheer up returning X-Man Colossus in a scheme involving his artwork and her storytelling.

Marrow left the X-Men during the six-month gap preceding the "X-Men Revolution", though her reasons for doing so are unclear.

She was next seen brainwashed by S.H.I.E.L.D. under the alias of "Sarah Rushman" used as a sleeper agent. Her mission was to terminate rogue Life Model Decoys. She had a split personality (mutant Marrow and human teenager Sarah) and had to be periodically injected to keep her implanted memory. With Spider-Man's help (he briefly dated her Sarah personality as Mary Jane was believed dead at this point), she freed herself from SHIELD's control by faking a suicide.

Weapon X
Marrow was later recruited by the most recent incarnation of Weapon X, who again normalized her appearance and her powers. However, she eventually betrayed Weapon X upon discovering their anti-mutant nature. She used the remnants of Cable's Underground to reform the Gene Nation terrorist group and, as their leader, led several terrorist attacks on Weapon X until the rest of the group was slaughtered by Agent Zero. Agent Zero left her alone, not wanting her to become a martyr, but he warned her that he would come after her again after he had hunted down the remaining members of Gene Nation.

Decimation

Marrow was next seen as a spokesman of a band of Morlocks after M-Day. She gave an interview to Sally Floyd for her ex-mutant diaries. Marrow remains underground to protect and give hope to the few mutants who remain and those who fear going to the surface to live normal lives. Mike Marts, editor for the X-Men comic books, confirmed in an interview that although Sarah retains some of the physical attributes of her mutation, her actual mutant powers disappeared during Decimation.

X-Cell
Marrow later turns up as a member of X-Cell, a terrorist group of former mutants believing that M-Day was caused by the U.S. government. As part of X-Cell, Marrow fought M and Siryn of X-Factor Investigations and after a turn of events in which she and Callisto learned the truth about who is responsible for M-Day, she turned against X-Cell supporter Quicksilver. Both heavily injured each other with a knife wound during the fight. Afterwards, she and Callisto managed to escape X-Factor and the government through the sewers.

X-Force
In Feb. 2014, Marrow returns as a member of a new X-Force team, along with a semblance of her powers intact. After some examination from Doctor Nemesis, Marrow is revealed to be not a mutant. It has since been revealed that Marrow wasn't abducted at all. She willingly approached Volga, the one responsible for giving former mutants their powers back, for an experimental procedure to restore her power. At this point Marrow was already pregnant and despite the great risks this posed for her child, she accepted. The procedure was successful, and Marrow's powers were restored at the cost of her child, and she was left for dead in Alexandria during the Alexandria Incident. She was eventually found by Cable, who provided her with an inhibitor collar built by Doctor Nemesis to suppress her memories and control her powers.

Secret Empire
In the Secret Empire storyline, Marrow is affiliated with New Tian and fights along other mutants. Afterwards, Sarah joins Magneto's new Brotherhood of Mutants. She and others under his service attack an anti-mutant rally in Washington DC. Some time later she appears at a self-help group therapy session for mutants who suffered from debilitating appearances due to their abilities.

Disassembled
After a massive reality distorting event caused by X-Man had left much of the mutant population decimated once again, Marrow and a couple of other mutants work with Emma Frost as debutantes in her new Hellfire Club. But they are soon beset by the O.N.E., now under command of the bigoted and corrupt Robert Callahan as part of his campaign of registering, incarcerating and modifying mutants for the purpose of exterminating other mutants. The duplicitous director coerces the Black King into tracking other mutants for his minions to round up in his government sanctioned facilities while under threat of execution. But Emma works with Marrow the others to contact the last remaining X-Men to deal with the O.N.E.

Dawn of X
Somewhere later down the line; after the new mutant nation of Krakoa was established and declared its independence upon the world stage, Professor X offers amnesty to all of mutant kind in the form of an invite to their personal island nation. Even the more socially abrasive amongst Homo Superior are welcomed amongst their growing numbers, as Marrow could be seen amongst an enclave of villainous mutants who accepted his summons. She is now a duly recognized citizen of the mutant nation.

Powers and abilities
Marrow is a mutant with the ability to enhance the growth of her skeletal structure. Initially this was uncontrollable, but after enhancement by a Skrull medical facility, and later by Weapon X, she can mostly control this, despite each enhancement having partially failed over time. She utilizes this power in many ways, including the creation of knuckle guards, spears, and projectile spikes.

She also possesses a healing factor and enhanced immune system, much in the same vein as Wolverine since every time a bone is ripped out a wound which remains closes itself soon after. She also possessed two hearts to compensate for her random bone growth, so when Storm ripped one out she was able to survive. It's possible that the first heart could have regrown due to the healing factor.

Her bones seem to be much more durable than normal; she had easily survived heavy hits in multiple areas of her body. For example, Flag-Smasher hit her twice on the head with his mace without much damage, and Sabretooth likewise threw her against a wall without harm. She also jumped off the Brooklyn Bridge twice (something that would have resulted in death or at least crippling injuries) without any major damage, being able to walk away from the scene.

Like most mutants in X-Men who possess a healing factor, Marrow is also more agile and stronger than the average woman in her age group and physical condition. Marrow has excellent tracking skills, spotting a hidden Prime Sentinel even a super soldier like Sabra had not noticed.

An often-overlooked part of Marrow's mutation is her unusual skin and hair color, which she has possessed since birth. In almost all of her appearances, Marrow has pink hair. While she is sometimes shown with a white skin tone, Marrow is more often shown to have a vivid pink tone in her skin. During her time with Weapon X her hair and skin color was depicted as having a notable purple tone.

Marrow has lost her abilities since M-Day and is a "Rem," a person with visible remains of the lost mutation.

In X-Force vol. 4 #2, it was revealed by Doctor Nemesis after much careful examination of Marrow, that while she regained her powers he also stated that she is still not a mutant and how she regained her original powers of generating bone weapons and her healing factor is unknown even to him and Cable, however, he had lied about the last part, since they had actually discovered that the process used on Marrow comes from the Earth-1287 universe. But the process was taxing on her CNS, her restored powers were overloading her biology and Nemesis ended that her body would give out in a years time as her cells began to spontaneously combust.

Reception
 In 2014, Entertainment Weekly ranked Marrow 19th in their "Let's rank every X-Man ever" list.

Other versions
Marrow makes a brief appearance in the second issue of the 2005 X-Men: Age of Apocalypse limited series, as a member of the Morlocks, a group of mutants who were victims of Sinister's experiments at the Breeding Pens. While it wasn't explicitly stated, it can be assumed that the reason Marrow became an adult without being at The Hill was due to the horrific experiments she was put through in the Breeding Pens.

In the 2005 "House of M" storyline, Marrow appears as a member of the Red Guard whose mission is to capture or eliminate the Hood's gang in Santa Rico. Sarah helped Rogue in killing the Sandman only to be shot down by the Hood.

In the alternate reality depicted in the 2011 "Age of X" storyline, Marrow had her powers. Whether she retained them after being returned to Reality-616 with the X-Men and other mutants remains to be seen.

In the Ultimate X-Men series, a character resembling Marrow is killed by Mister Sinister acting on orders from Apocalypse.

In other media

Television

Marrow appears in Wolverine and the X-Men, voiced by Tara Strong. This version is from a future dominated by Master Mold. She was first doubtful of Professor Xavier's leadership when the Sentinels brought Cerebro to the camp. She is later saved from being squashed by a Sentinel by Xavier. Marrow befriends a reprogrammed Sentinel dubbed "Rover". When Rover is destroyed due to Bishop's decision of using the robot as a decoy against other Sentinels, Marrow decides to help the Sentinels against Xavier, since the Professor's presence in the future caused the death of her only true friend. This relationship with Rover is a take on the brief series Sentinel and bears similar plot elements to those of Tom Skylark and Rover in Grant Morrison's "Here Comes Tomorrow" arc from New X-Men. However, though she didn't intend for anyone else to get hurt, the Sentinels betray her and attack. She and Polaris later help Xavier fight Master Mold.

Video games
 Marrow appears as a playable character in Marvel vs. Capcom 2 voiced by Susan Hart.
 Marrow makes a background appearance in Ultimate Marvel vs Capcom 3 in a Days of Future Past-esqe poster; it says she was slain.
 Marrow is a boss character in X-Men Legends, voiced by Nancy Linari. She leads both the Morlocks and Gene Nation. She eventually sides with the Brotherhood after she arranges for Healer's capture, until she's informed that the Brotherhood care nothing for her people. In X-Men Legends II: Rise of Apocalypse, during Apocalypse's invasion on New York, she is mentioned by Moira MacTaggert to have survived along with most of her Morlock people from Apocalypse and Mister Sinister's attack on New York, and is stated as helping in refugee aid.

References

External links
 Marrow at Marvel.com

Characters created by Jeph Loeb
Characters created by Joe Madureira
Characters created by Scott Lobdell
Comics characters introduced in 1994
Fictional blade and dart throwers
Fictional characters with superhuman durability or invulnerability
Fictional knife-fighters
Marvel Comics characters with accelerated healing
Marvel Comics characters with superhuman strength
Marvel Comics female superheroes
Marvel Comics female supervillains
Marvel Comics mutants
Marvel Comics orphans
X-Men members